Ena montana is a species of air-breathing land snails, terrestrial pulmonate gastropod molluscs in the family Enidae.

Distribution 
This species occurs in European countries and islands including: 
 Czech Republic
 Great Britain, rare in south England
 Poland
 Slovakia
 Bulgaria
 Russia
 Ukraine

Description 

The weight of the adult live snail is about 208.5±17.3 mg.

References

 Bank, R. A.; Neubert, E. (2017). Checklist of the land and freshwater Gastropoda of Europe. Last update: July 16th, 2017
 Sysoev, A. V. & Schileyko, A. A. (2009). Land snails and slugs of Russia and adjacent countries. Sofia/Moskva (Pensoft). 312 pp., 142 plates.

External links
 Draparnaud, J.-P.-R. (1801). Tableau des mollusques terrestres et fluviatiles de la France. Montpellier / Paris (Renaud / Bossange, Masson & Besson). 1-116

Enidae
Gastropods described in 1801